Johan Södergran (born November 20, 1999) is a Swedish professional ice hockey winger currently playing with Modo Hockey in the HockeyAllsvenskan (Allsv). Södergran was drafted in the sixth round of the 2018 NHL Entry Draft, 165th overall, by the Los Angeles Kings.

Playing career
Södergran made his SHL debut with Linköping HC in 2016, playing in a single game during the 2015–16 SHL season.

In the 2018–19 season, Södergran appeared in 42 games with Linköping HC, posting 8 goals and 13 points. On 10 June 2019, he agreed to a three-year, entry-level contract with the Los Angeles Kings.

With his second North American professional season delayed due to the COVID-19 pandemic, Södergran remained in Sweden and was loaned by the Kings to HockeyAllsvenskan club, Almtuna IS, on 29 August 2020. He appeared in 12 games with Almtuna, collecting 3 points before his loan ended after suffering an injury.

Returning to North America for the 2021–22 season, Södergran posted 3 goals in a limited 7 appearances before he was returned to continue his development in Europe, loaned by the Kings to German top-flight club, Eisbären Berlin of the Deutsche Eishockey Liga (DEL) on 2 March 2022.

After contributing in the Eisbären Berlin championship, Södergran as a free agent from the Kings, returned to his native Sweden in agreeing to a two-year contract with Modo Hockey of the Allsveskan on 26 May 2022.

Career statistics

Regular season and playoffs

International

References

External links
 

1999 births
Living people
Almtuna IS players
Eisbären Berlin players
Linköping HC players
Los Angeles Kings draft picks
Ontario Reign (AHL) players
Swedish ice hockey right wingers
Ice hockey people from Stockholm